Tabernaemontana aurantiaca Gaudich is a species of plant in the family Apocynaceae (dogbane family) with the common name orange milkwood. It is found in Maluku, Papuasia, Vanuatu, and Micronesia.

References

aurantiaca